Tärnsjö is a locality situated in Heby Municipality, Uppsala County, Sweden, with 1,221 inhabitants in 2010.

References 

Populated places in Uppsala County
Populated places in Heby Municipality